Tagetik develops and sells cloud and on-premises corporate performance management software applications for use by corporate finance teams and their business users.

History
Tagetik has headquarters in Lucca, Italy and Stamford, Connecticut. In July 2014, the company announced $36 million in outside funding. In June 2015, the company acquired iNovasion, a Netherlands-based company, and opened its Benelux direct operation. In February 2016, Tagetik established Tagetik GmbH, a direct operation for the German, Austrian, and Swiss markets.  In September 2016, the company opened a new office in Brussels. In December 2016, Tagetik established Tagetik Nordic AB, a direct operation for the Swedish, Norwegian, Finnish, Danish, and Icelandic markets, and opened a new office in Stockholm.

On 6 April 2017 Tagetik was acquired by Wolters Kluwer.

Product
The company’s software monitors and manages financial performance and processes, such as budgeting, consolidation, planning and forecasting, disclosure management, and reporting. The software uses Microsoft Office, using Microsoft Excel, Word and PowerPoint for input and report templates. The software also has connectors to Microsoft Power BI, SharePoint, SQL Server, Dynamics AX and NAV and runs on Microsoft Azure.
 
Tagetik runs on Microsoft SQL Server, PostgreSQL, Oracle or SAP HANA databases. The company also has developed a connector to the Qlik Analytics Platform and to SAP to automate extracting and mapping data and metadata from SAP ECC FI, and BW tables.

Via cpmVision, a Microsoft Power BI and CCH® Tagetik connection is established. Providing you with a scala of CCH® Tagetik functionality within the Power BI reporting instance.

Analyst Evaluations

Tagetik is routinely evaluated by recognized research and advisory firms.  Recent evaluations include:
 Gartner: 2016 Magic Quadrant for Financial Corporate Performance Management Solutions
 Gartner: 2016 Magic Quadrant for Strategic Corporate Performance Management Solutions
 Gartner:  2016 Critical Capabilities for Financial Corporate Performance Management Solutions
 Gartner: 2016 Critical Capabilities for Strategic Corporate Performance Management Solutions 
 Forrester Research: The Forrester Wave™: Enterprise Performance Management, Q4 2016

Customers and Partners
As of June 2015, Tagetik had approximately 750 corporate customers around the world.  Representative customers include: Fiat Chrysler, Henkel, Webster Bank, Randstad, Carillion, and John Hancock-Manulife.  Major consulting partners include Satriun, Accenture, Alper & Schetter Consulting GmbH, Deloitte, Ernst & Young, KPMG, and PwC. Among Tagetik’s technology partners are Amazon Web Services, Microsoft, NetSuite, Qlik, and SAP.

External links
 Official website

References

Software companies based in Connecticut
Software companies of Italy
Companies based in Lucca
Companies based in Stamford, Connecticut
Defunct software companies of the United States